Fenton is a village and civil parish in the West Lindsey district of Lincolnshire, England. The population of the civil parish was 297 at the 2001 census, increasing to 353 at the 2011 census.

Fenton is a centre for the breeding of a local cattle variety, the Lincoln Reds. It is also a centre for fishing, being  to the east the River Trent.

The ecclesiastical parish is Kettlethorpe with Fenton, part of the Saxilby Group of the Deanery of Corringham.  The parish church is in the smaller village of Kettlethorpe  to the south. The 2014 incumbent is Rev Canon Rhys Prosser.

The village public house is the Carpenters Arms.

References

External links

Villages in Lincolnshire
Civil parishes in Lincolnshire
West Lindsey District